Cheonwang Station is a subway station on the Seoul Subway Line 7. Line 7 trains are serviced at Gwangmyeong Train Depot, located between Onsu Station and the preceding Gwangmyeongsageori Station.

Station layout

Vicinity
Exit 1 : Oryu-dong, Kodit Membership Training Centre, Ippenhaus Apartment Complex
Exit 2 : Oryu 2-dong Security Serive Centre
Exit 3 : Oryu 2-dong, Gae-yoong Mountain

Connection
There are 4 bus lines through this station.

 Seoul bus 6640 (Green)
 Public light bus Guro04 / Guro14 / Guro 15

References

Seoul Metropolitan Subway stations
Metro stations in Guro District, Seoul
Railway stations opened in 2000
2000 establishments in South Korea